Hlukhiv Okruha was an okruha (regional district) in 1923–1930 in northeastern Ukraine. Its administrative centre was located in Hlukhiv. 

The okruha was created in 1923 as Novhorod-Siverskyi Okruha centered in Novhorod-Siverskyi and was part of the Chernigov Governorate. In 1925-1930 it served as a first-level administrative division within the Ukrainian SSR. During that time on 19 September 1925 its administrative center was moved to Hlukhiv and the okruha was renamed accordingly. Also couple of its raions were transferred to the neighboring Konotop Okruha. On 16 October 1925 Hlukhiv Okruha was expanded after to its territory was added a territory of the former Putivl County out of Oryol Governorate of the Russian SFSR as well as several border villages of the same governorate from other former counties. On 19 April 1926 more villages of the Oryol Governorate were added to the okruha.

In 1926 the Hlukhiv Okruha consisted of 11 raions.

References

External links
 Hlukhiv Okruha at Encyclopedia of History of Ukraine
 Government of the Hlukhiv Okruha at the Handbook on history of the Communist Party and the Soviet Union 1898–1991

States and territories established in 1923
States and territories disestablished in 1930
1923 establishments in Ukraine
1930 disestablishments in Ukraine
Okruhas of Ukraine
Okruhas of Chernigov Governorate
History of Sumy Oblast
History of Chernihiv Oblast